E44, E-44 or E.44 may refer to:

Transportation 
 European route E44, a road part of the E-road network
 E 44 road (United Arab Emirates)
 PRR E44, an American electric road switcher locomotive built for the Pennsylvania Railroad
 Kushiro Sotokan Road and Nemuro Road, route E44 in Japan

Military 
 HMS E44, a World War I-era British E-class submarine